Robert Eramouspé, (Saint-Jean-de-Luz, 8 September 1935 -  Marignane, 29 May 2020), was a French rugby league player in the 1950s, 1960s and 1970s.

He played for several clubs, starting with Côte Basque before its folding, later Roanne with a French Championship title in 1960 and a Lord Derby Cup title in 1962, and Marseille with two new Lord Derby Cup titles in 1965 and 1971.

Thanks to his club performances, he was called up several times to represent France between 1959 and 1964 and took part at the 1960 Rugby League World Cup.

Biography 
After the first years at Côte Basque, the club was forced to declare bankrupt, thus freeing the players before the 1957–58 season. Eramouspe, then took the path to Roanne.

Honours 

 Collectif :
 Winner of the French Championship : 1960 (Roanne).
 Winner of the Lord Derby Cup : 1962 (Roanne), 1965 and 1971 (Marseille).
 Runner-up at French Championship : 1961 (Roanne).

References

External links 
Robert-Eramouspé at rugbyleagueproject.com

French rugby league players
1935 births
2020 deaths
Rugby league second-rows
Marseille XIII players
RC Roanne XIII players
Sportspeople from Pyrénées-Atlantiques
People from Saint-Jean-de-Luz
France national rugby league team players